Parsons Peak is a mountain in Yosemite National Park and the Cathedral Range of California's Sierra Nevada. The mountain has a ridge extending northwest from the summit. This point is the highest point in Mariposa County. The summit of Parsons Peak is just outside Mariposa County.

Most of the precipitation that falls on the mountain is snow due to the very high elevation.

The peak was named for Edward Taylor Parsons who for many years was a director of the Sierra Club.

See also 
 List of highest points in California by county
 Simmons Peak

References 

Mountains of Madera County, California
Mountains of Tuolumne County, California
Mountains of Yosemite National Park
Mountains of Northern California